Vine was an American short-form video hosting service where users could share six-second-long looping video clips. It was originally launched on January 24, 2013, by Vine Labs, Inc. Bought by Twitter in 2012 before its launch, the service was shut down on January 17, 2017 and the app was discontinued a few months later.

Videos published on Vine's social network could also be shared on different social networking platforms such as Facebook and Twitter. The Vine app was also used to browse videos, along with a group of videos that were uploaded by theme, and hoping that users could "trend" videos. Vine competed with other social media services such as Instagram and Snapchat. By December 2015, Vine had over 200 million active users. 

On October 27, 2016, Twitter announced that it would disable all uploads, but that viewing and download would continue to work. On January 20, 2017, Twitter launched an online archive of every Vine video that had ever been published. The archive was officially discontinued in April 2019. Vine's co-founder Dom Hofmann created a successor that was called Byte (not affiliated with Twitter) which launched on January 24, 2020. The Byte app was acquired by Clash a year later on January 26, 2021. Months later the Byte app was re-launched as Clash, which was eventually re-branded as Huddles.

History
Vine was founded by Dom Hofmann, Rus Yusupov, and Colin Kroll in June 2012. The company was acquired by Twitter in October 2012 for a reported $30 million but was later reformed as Intermedia Labs. Vine launched on January 24, 2013, as a free app for iOS devices. An Android version was released on June 2, 2013. On November 12, 2013, the application was released for Windows Phone. In a couple of months, Vine became the most used video sharing application in the market, even with low adoption of the app. On April 9, 2013, Vine became the most downloaded free app within the iOS App Store and on May 1, 2014, Vine launched the web version of the service to explore videos.

In July 2014, Vine updated its app with a new "loop count", meaning every time someone watched a vine, a number on top of the video would appear showing how many times it was viewed. The "loop count" also included views from vines that were embedded onto other websites. On October 14, 2014, an Xbox One version was released allowing Xbox Live members to watch the looping videos.

On October 27, 2016, Vine announced that Twitter would be discontinuing the Vine mobile app. Vine said users of the service would be notified before any changes to the app or website were made. The company also stated that the website and the app would still be available for users to view and download Vines, but users would no longer be able to post.

The discontinuation of Vine came as many different competing platforms began to introduce their own equivalents to Vine's short-form video approach. Platforms such as Instagram began to introduce their own takes on the short video angle, such as Instagram Video where users were able to upload 15-second videos to their profiles.

Marketers leaving the platform was also a large part of the decision by Twitter to discontinue Vine. Many monetary sources began to move to longer short video platforms, and with them followed many popular Vine creators. Since the start of 2016, more than half of Vine users with more than 15,000 followers had ceased uploading or had deleted their accounts to move on to other platforms such as YouTube, Instagram and Snapchat. 

On December 16, 2016, it was announced that the Vine mobile app would remain operational as a standalone service, allowing users to publish their videos directly to Twitter instead of Vine; the Vine community website would shut down in January. On January 17, 2017, the app was renamed to "Vine Camera". Although the app still enabled users to record six-second videos, they could only be shared on Twitter or saved on a camera roll. The release of the Vine Camera was met with poor reviews on both the Android and iOS App Stores. On January 20, 2017, Twitter launched an Internet archive of all Vine videos, allowing people to continue watching previously filmed Vine videos however in 2019 this was also removed by Twitter.

The Verge reported that the closure of Vine led many of its most notable users, such as Kurtis Conner, David Dobrik, Danny Gonzalez,  Drew Gooden, Liza Koshy, Shawn Mendes, Jake Paul, Logan Paul, and Lele Pons, to move to other video-sharing platforms.

In November 2018, co-founder Dom Hoffman announced the upcoming successor to Vine, Byte, also previously known as V2; it was slated to come out in spring 2019. The Byte application launched publicly a year later on January 24, 2020. In 2021, Vine has announced that they will shut down their company.

After Elon Musk completed his purchase of social media company Twitter, he posted a poll on Twitter on October 30, 2022, whether to "Bring back Vine?". It has received over 4.9 million votes, with the majority (69.6%) being in favor.  An Axios article published on October 31, 2022, stated that Musk purportedly requested Twitter engineers work on rebooting Vine.

Features
Vine enabled users to record short video clips up to  six seconds long while recording through its in-app camera. The camera would record only while the screen was being touched, enabling users to edit on the fly or create stop motion effects. Additional features were added to the app in July 2013; these included grid and ghost image tools for the camera, curated channels (including themed areas and trending topics/users), the ability to "revine" (share again, similar to Twitter's "retweet") videos on a personal stream, and protected posts.

In August 2015, Vine introduced Vine Music, whose "Snap to Beat" feature creates perfect infinite music loops. In June 2016, Vine announced that it was experimenting with letting users attach video clips up to 140 seconds.

Vine Kids
In January 2015, Vine launched Vine Kids, an app for iOS that was designed specifically for children aged 7 to 12. It was designed by a group of Vine employees in order to try to create a safer space for younger users to eventually watch content which was deemed appropriate for children. Every video posted to the app was selected by Vine employees to ensure their safety.

Vine's Head of Communication and Marketing, Carolyn Penner, noting the features of the app, told CNN that "children can always swipe back and forth on the mobile screen to find new videos, and they can also tap on the screen to produce some sound effects".

Usage 
Vine attracted different types of uses, including short-form comedy and music performances, video editing, and stop motion animation. On February 1, 2013, a Turkish journalist used Vine to document the aftermath of the 2013 United States embassy bombing in Ankara. Vine had also gained ground as a promotional tool; in 2013, the track listing of Daft Punk's album Random Access Memories was revealed via a Vine video, and on September 9, 2013, Dunkin Donuts became the first company to use a single Vine as an entire television advertisement. A&W Restaurants launched its Mini Polar Swirls on Vine on April 1, 2014, with the claim that it was the first product launch on Vine.

Music-oriented videos also shared success on the service; in July 2013, a Vine post featuring a group of women twerking to the 2012 song "Don't Drop That Thun Thun" became popular, spawned response videos, and led the previously obscure song to peak at number 35 on the Billboard Hot 100 chart. In March 2013, 22 Vines were presented in an exhibit entitled #SVAES (The Shortest Video Art Ever Sold) at the Moving Image art fair in New York City. Copies of the videos were available to purchase on thumb drives for US$200 each. Angela Washko's "Tits on Tits on Ikea" was sold to Dutch art advisor, curator and collector Myriam Vanneschi during the event, marking the first-ever sale of a Vine as art.

Following the shooting of Michael Brown in August 2014, then-St Louis City Alderman Antonio French used Vine as a way to document the protests in Ferguson and the surrounding area. These videos were among the earliest accounts of the racial tensions in Ferguson, and helped bring national attention to the situation.

Reception
A BBC review described collections of Vine videos as "mesmerizing", like "[watching a] bewildering carousel of six-second slices of ordinary life [roll] past."

An article by The New Yorker investigated the impact of online video platforms in creating a new generation of celebrities, stating: "A Vine's blink-quick transience, combined with its endless looping, simultaneously squeezes time and stretches it." While a given loop's brevity seems to "squeeze time", repeated viewings allow users to absorb rich detail, thereby subjectively "stretching time."

Many brands used the service as a free platform for advertising their products, showing off exclusive content and creating contests to keep consumers interested in the brand. Cadbury UK had used their profile to show off new confectionaries that were in the making and created a contest around giving out samples to keep people coming back to the chocolate company. Many local and chain bookstores used the site to show off new books.  Other companies developed a more personal connection with consumers using their six-second videos. This also allowed fans of different brands to show off their loyalty to the brand and in turn advertised the brand from a different perspective, this included makeup videos and the like.

Soon after its launch, Vine faced criticism for how it handled pornography; while porn is not forbidden by Twitter's guidelines, one sexually explicit clip was accidentally featured as an "Editor's Pick" in the Vine app as a result of "human error". Because pornography violates Apple's terms of service, the app's rating was changed to 17+ in February 2013 following a request by Apple. Vine was listed among Times '50 Best Android Apps for 2013'.

Competitors
Instagram added 15-second video sharing in June 2013. Since then, the video functionality expanded with additional features: widescreen videos, 60-second videos, and up to 10 minutes of video in a multi-video post. As with Vine, Instagram videos loop and have no playback controls by default. Snapchat added 10-second video sharing in December 2012.

YouTube launched a GIF creator in 2014. This tool allows up to six seconds of any supported YouTube video to be converted to a GIF. Sign-ups for the GIF beta are now discontinued. YouTube later began catering to those who create primarily shorter videos with its YouTube Shorts platform.

TikTok (called Douyin in China) was created a few months before the discontinuation of Vine. Its current edition is the result of the merger of the original TikTok app with Musical.ly, which was founded in 2014 and became popular in 2015. TikTok is similar to Vine in that it is a simple short video platform with the added option of Duet, meaning that two different TikTok creators may collaborate at different times to create a final video; The Verge called it "the closest thing we'll get to having Vine back". TikTok is not much younger than Vine, as its predecessor Musical.ly was introduced only a year after Vine's inception, but it exploded in popularity in the late 2010s after Vine was shut down.

Successor

Huddles (originally named "Byte" later Clash) is a successor to Vine created by a team led by Vine co-founder Dom Hofmann. Videos can last between two and six-and-a-half seconds and loop continuously. The launch had originally been planned for mid-2018. Reports from early 2018 showed that Hofmann had already started reaching out to social media personalities in hopes to secure viral content for the new platform. On May 4, 2018, Hofmann announced on the V2 community forums website and the official Twitter account that the project had been postponed indefinitely. On November 8, 2018, Hofmann announced the official name for 'V2' would be 'Byte', and that it was set for release in the spring of 2019. Byte underwent a closed beta period with community members from a Byte dedicated forum who were invited to test the app. Byte was officially launched on the iOS and Android stores on January 24, 2020. On January 26, 2021, Hofmann announced in the Byte forum that the app would be run by a company named Clash. Months later Byte was re-launched and re-named to Clash, which was eventually re-named again to Huddles.

See also
 Internet meme
 Likee

References

External links
 

Internet properties established in 2013
Internet properties disestablished in 2017
Android (operating system) software
IOS software
Twitter, Inc. acquisitions
2012 mergers and acquisitions
Video hosting
Video software
Twitter services and applications
2013 software
Universal Windows Platform apps
Xbox One software
Proprietary cross-platform software
Defunct social networking services